This is a list of notable footballers who have played for Charlton Athletic F.C.. This means players who have played 100 or more first-class matches for the club.

For a list of all Charlton Athletic players, major or minor, with a Wikipedia article, see :Category:Charlton Athletic F.C. players
For current players see Charlton Athletic F.C. Current squad

Players are listed in alphabetical order. Appearances and goals are for first-team competitive matches only (including Cup matches). Substitute appearances included.

Statistics correct as of 29 March 2017.

Players
 
Charlton Athletic
Association football player non-biographical articles